Bless the Beasts and Children may refer to:

Bless the Beasts and Children (novel), a 1970 novel by Glendon Swarthout
Bless the Beasts and Children (film), the 1971 film adaptation directed by Stanley Kramer and starring Bill Mumy
Bless the Beasts and Children (soundtrack), the soundtrack to the film
"Bless the Beasts and Children" (song), the theme song to the film performed by The Carpenters